The Ven  Florence Kelly, Prebendary of Kilmoylan,   was  Archdeacon of Tuam  during 1622.

Notes

Irish Anglicans
Archdeacons of Tuam
Year of birth missing
Year of death missing